USS Hawkbill (SSN-666), a  attack submarine, was the second ship of the United States Navy to be named for the hawksbill, a large sea turtle. The name perpetuated the inadvertent misspelling of "hawksbill" in the naming of the first ship of that name, a  submarine launched in 1944. USS Hawkbill (SSN-666) was the eighteenth of 39 Sturgeon-class nuclear-powered submarines that were built.

Hawkbill was sometimes called "The Devil Boat" or the "Devilfish" because of her hull number (666), from chapter 13 of the Book of Revelation, in the Bibles New Testament, which begins "And I stood upon the sand of the sea, and saw a beast rise up out of the sea...." and ends "Here is wisdom. Let him that hath understanding count the number of the beast: for it is the number of a man; and his number is six hundred threescore and six;" and the resulting association in Christianity of the number 666 with the Devil and the Antichrist.

Construction and commissioning
The contract to build Hawkbill was awarded to the Mare Island Division of San Francisco Bay Naval Shipyard in Vallejo, California, on 18 December 1964 and her keel was laid down there on 12 September 1966.  She was launched on 12 April 1969, sponsored by Mrs. Bernard F. Roeder, the wife of Vice Admiral Bernard F. Roeder, Commander United States First Fleet, and commissioned on 4 February 1971.

Service history
In 1980, Hawkbill completed a scheduled [wikt:overhaul|overhaul] of her reactor core at Puget Sound Naval Shipyard at Bremerton, Washington, with her crew berthed at Naval Submarine Base Bangor at Bangor, Washington. After sea trials and sound trials and port visits to Nanaimo, British Columbia, Canada; Alameda, California; and San Diego, California, Hawkbill returned to Pearl Harbor, Hawaii, commanded by Fred Crawford, where she joined Submarine Squadron ONE.

In 1982, Hawkbill made a Western Pacific cruise, under the command of George Roletter, with stops at Yokosuka, Japan; Subic Bay, the Philippines; and Hong Kong.

Hawkbill made a dependent cruise from Lahaina, Maui, Hawaii to home port in Pearl Harbor.  In early 1984, Hawkbill deployed to the Arctic, undertaking an 87-day excursion under the polar ice cap which included visits to Chinhae, South Korea; and Guam. Hawkbill earned two Battle Efficiency "E" awards from Submarine Squadron ONE during this period. 

Hawkbill was decommissioned on 15 March 2000, the last of the "short-hull" Sturgeon-class attack submarines to be decommissioned, and that same day both was stricken from the Naval Vessel Register and entered the Ship and Submarine Recycling Program at Puget Sound Naval Shipyard for scrapping. Her scrapping was completed on 1 December 2000.

Commemoration

Hawkbills sail was preserved and is exhibited in the Idaho Science Center in Arco, Idaho.

References 
 
 
 NavSource Online: Submarine Photo Archive Hawkbill (SSN-666) Keel Laying / Commissioning
 NavSource Online: Submarine Photo Archive Hawkbill (SSN-666) Active Service - Decommissioning

External links
 USS Hawkbill (SSN-666)

 

Sturgeon-class submarines
Cold War submarines of the United States
Nuclear submarines of the United States Navy
Ships built in Vallejo, California
1969 ships